Tommy Lynn Sells (June 28, 1964 – April 3, 2014) was an American serial killer. He was convicted of one murder, for which he received the death penalty and was eventually executed. Authorities believe he committed a total of 22 murders and he claimed on various occasions to have murdered over 70 people.

Early life
Tommy Lynn Sells was born in Oakland, California on June 28, 1964 as one of five children to an unwed mother. Sells’ presumed biological father, Joe Lovins, died when Sells was 11. Sells and his twin sister, Tammy Jean, contracted meningitis when they were 18-months-old; Tammy died from the illness. Shortly thereafter, Sells was sent to live with his aunt, Bonnie Walpole, in Holcomb, Missouri. At age 5, he was returned to his mother after she discovered the aunt wanted to adopt him. 

At 7-years-old, Sells began regularly drinking alcohol obtained from a supply stash belonging to his maternal grandfather.  Within a year, he was socialising with an adult man named Willis Clark, who Sells alleges began molesting him. Sells claims his mother condoned the relationship, which traumatized and further impacted him greatly. 

Sells said he would later relive those experiences while committing his crimes. At age 10, Sells started using narcotics. Three years later, he entered his grandmother's bed nude while she was sleeping, leading to him being banned from the house. Shortly after that, his mother and siblings abandoned him by abruptly leaving town. A few days later, in a fit of rage, he shot a woman and assaulted her,  though she survived. Sells began living as a nomad permanently in 1978, at the age of 14. When Sells visited family in Little Rock, Arkansas, in May 1981, his mother threw him out after he tried to molest her in the shower. Thereafter, he failed to receive mental health assistance, his drinking increased, and ultimately led to his first arrest in 1982 for public intoxication.

Criminal history and psychology
Homeless, Sells hitchhiked and train-hopped across the United States from 1978 to 1999, committing various crimes along the way. He held several very short-term manual-labor and barber jobs. He drank heavily, abused drugs, and was imprisoned several times. In 1990, Sells stole a truck in Wyoming and was sentenced to 16 months' imprisonment. He was diagnosed with a personality disorder consisting of antisocial, borderline, and schizoid features, substance use disorder (severe opioid, amphetamines, and alcohol dependence), bipolar disorder, major depressive disorder, and psychosis.

On May 13, 1992, Fabienne Witherspoon, a 19-year-old woman in Charleston, West Virginia, was driving when she saw Sells panhandling under an overpass with a sign that said, "I will work for food." She felt sorry for him and took him to her home, asking him to wait outside. She went into her home to get some food for him, and by the time she got back to her front door, he was inside. When she walked away to get something else, he got a knife from her kitchen, trapped her in a bathroom, and attempted to rape her. The woman fought back, hitting him in the head repeatedly with a ceramic duck and getting control of his knife and stabbing him, nicking his kidney and liver. In addition, his testicle was sliced. In retaliation, Sells beat her over the head with a piano stool. Sells tried to get away but his injuries landed him in the ICU and in police custody. Witherspoon sustained significant injuries herself including a gape in her head and a cut in her hand that required surgery. After this attack, Sells took a plea deal on malicious wounding charges and served five years in prison. While serving this sentence, he was diagnosed with bipolar disorder and married Nora Price. He was released in 1997 and moved to Tennessee with his wife. He then left her that same year and resumed his cross-country travels.

Murders
Police investigators believe Sells murdered at least 22 people. Retired Texas Ranger John Allen said, "We did confirm 22... I know there's more. I know there's a lot more. Obviously, we won't ever know [a definite number of crimes by Sells]." Sells said he committed his first murder at age 15 in Mississippi, after breaking into a house. While in the house, Sells claimed to have discovered a man performing fellatio on a boy and killed the man in a fit of rage. This confessed crime has not been confirmed. Furthermore, in 1980 Sells claimed he killed a man with an ice pick near a Chinese restaurant in Los Angeles which has also never been confirmed. Nonetheless, Sells has been linked or has confessed to multiple crimes:
 July 5, 1979, Port Gibson, Mississippi: John Cade, 39, was killed with a .32 calibre pistol during a home invasion. Near the crime scene, a man who resembled Sells was observed. He may have been in the area around this period, according to investigators.
 April 27, 1982, Little Rock, Arkansas: In November 2015, Melissa DeBoer née Tate contacted police after watching an episode of Crime Watch Daily which featured Sells. In 1982, DeBoer's mother, JoAnne Tate, 35, was murdered in her St. Louis home; her testimony as a 7-year-old assaulted in the sexual attack helped identify Rodney Lincoln as the killer. However, DeBoer came to believe Sells, not Lincoln, murdered her mother in 1982. In 2018, Missouri Governor Eric Greitens commuted Lincoln's sentence to time served and he was released from prison.
 July 31, 1983, St. Louis, Missouri: Tiffany Gill, 4, and Colleen Gill, 33, were discovered at their house on Washington Terrace in the West End neighbourhood. With a blunt weapon, they had both been battered to death. A man matching Sells’ description was seen leaving the crime scene. Sells, who at the time of the double homicide resided in the 3300 block of Edmundson Road in Breckenbridge Hills, had relatives who lived in the St. Louis region.
 July 26, 1985, Springfield, Missouri: In July 1985, 21-year-old Sells worked at a Forsyth, Missouri, carnival, where he met 28-year-old Ena Cordt and her 4-year-old son Rory Cordt. Cordt invited Sells to her home that evening. According to Sells, he had sex with her, fell asleep, and awoke to find her stealing from his backpack. He proceeded to beat Cordt to death with her son's baseball bat. He then murdered her son because the child was a potential witness. The bludgeoned bodies were found three days later, by which time Sells had left town.
 May 1, 1987, Lockport, New York: Suzanne Korcz, 27, disappeared after leaving a Lockport nightclub alone. Her body was found on September 5, 1995, at the foot of an embankment near Niagara Falls, two miles away. Her cause of death was unknown due to decomposition. In 2004, Sells confessed that he had murdered a woman in the area at the time, and his presence in the city was confirmed; he was even able to identify her and photographs from the crime scene. Since he had already been sentenced to death, he was not prosecuted.
 October 15, 1987, Lovelock, Nevada: Stefanie Kelly Stroh, 21, was last seen at the Four Way Cafe and Truck Stop in Wells, Nevada. Sells confessed to Stroh's murder. He said he picked her up while she was hitchhiking after he offered her a ride to Reno, Nevada. They took LSD together, then he strangled her in Lovelock, covered her body in concrete, and dumped it in a hot spring. Her body was never found.
 November 17, 1987, Ina, Illinois: Sells confessed to the murders of four members of the Dardeen family. While he was hitchhiking, Sells was picked up by Keith Dardeen, 29, who brought him to his home for dinner. When they arrived at the residence, Sells pulled out a handgun and shot Keith in the head twice. He then emasculated him before shooting him once more in the head. Keith's 3-year-old son, Peter Dardeen, was bludgeoned to death and Sells also attacked Elaine Dardeen, Keith's 30-year-old pregnant wife; she went into labour after being beaten to death and gave birth to her daughter (whose  name was supposed to be Casey Dardeen). He fatally bludgeoned Casey before mutilating Elaine's breasts and sexually assaulting her corpse with the baseball bat that he had used to murder her children which he left protruding out of her vagina.
 December 18, 1988, Tucson, Arizona: Kent Alan Lauten, 51, was stabbed and buried in a shallow grave near a homeless camp. Sells claimed he killed Lauten because he refused to pay for drugs. His body was found two days later.
 December 9, 1991, Marianna, Florida: Teresa Hall, 25, and her 5-year-old Tiffany Hall were both bludgeoned to death with a wooden table leg in their home. The killer had kicked the front door in, smashed a wooden table to pieces, and used one of the legs as a murder weapon. Serial killer Ángel Maturino Reséndiz was suspected of the crime originally but Sells later confessed to the double-murder.
 October 13, 1997, Lawrenceville, Illinois:  10-year-old Joel Kirkpatrick was stabbed to death in his bedroom while he was sleeping at night. His mother, Julie Rea-Harper, ran to her son's bedroom, encountered an intruder wearing a ski mask, and then fought off the intruder before fleeing. The murder weapon, a steak knife from Lea's kitchen, had been left on the floor outside Joel's bedroom. She was convicted of Joel's murder but was eventually exonerated in 2006 when Sells confessed to the crime. He claimed he targeted Joel because his mother insulted him at a nearby store.
 October 15, 1997, Springfield, Missouri: 13-year-old Stephanie Mahaney was found in 1997 in a farm pond west of Springfield. According to Sells, he pulled her from her bed in her home at night, drove her to a field, injected her with cocaine, raped her, and strangled her to death.
 December 14, 1997, Las Vegas, Nevada: 19-year-old Yvette Sophia Mueller was last seen in an RV park in Las Vegas. Sells claimed to have raped and killed a blonde-haired woman in Las Vegas, chopped her body up with an axe, and buried her next to the Snake River. The body was never found because it had been swept away by a landslide, but officials suspect Sells was referring to Mueller.
 April 15, 1998, San Antonio, Texas: Thomas Brose, 40, was a carnival worker who was shot to death in his motorhome. He was seen with a man matching Sells’ description. Sells initially confessed to the crime but later recanted it.
 April 4, 1999, Gibson, Tennessee: Debra Harris, 31, and her 8-year-old daughter Ambria Halliburton were both killed after Sells broke into their house at night and raped Harris in her bed. She was stabbed repeatedly to death with her own kitchen knife which was left in her chest. Halliburton was stabbed three times after she witnessed Sells murder her mother.
 April 18, 1999, San Antonio, Texas: 9-year-old Mary Beatrice Perez was kidnapped from a market festival, driven to a stockyard, raped, and strangled to death with her T-shirt. Her body was found in a creek ten days later. Sells was convicted of the murder.
 May 23, 1999, Lexington, Kentucky: Haley McHone, 13, was kidnapped from a swing by Sells, dragged into a wooded area, and raped. She was then strangled to death with her T-shirt and covered with debris. Her body was found ten days later. Sells was arrested in the area around that time for an unrelated charge.
 July 5, 1999, Kingfisher, Oklahoma: Bobbie Lynn Wofford, 14, was picked up from a Love's Convenience Store by Sells, who drove her to a secluded area, orally raped her, stabbed her repeatedly with a hatchet, and then shot her in the head with a large calibre revolver when she tried to escape. He dumped her body off the side of the road and kept two of her earrings.
 December 31, 1999, Del Rio, Texas: Kaylene “Katy” Harris, 13, was sexually assaulted, stabbed sixteen times and her throat slashed by Sells after he broke into her trailer. Sells also attacked Krystal Surles, 10, who was in the same property but she ultimately survived.

Arrests and confessions

On December 31, 1999, in the Guajia Bay subdivision, west of Del Rio, Texas, Sells sexually assaulted, stabbed and killed 13-year-old Kaylene "Katy" Harris before slitting the throat of 10-year-old Krystal Surles. Krystal survived and received help from the neighbors after traveling a quarter-mile to their home with a severed trachea. Sells was apprehended after being identified from a sketch made from the victim's description. 

Police over time came to suspect him of "working the system" by confessing to murders he had not committed. Sells confessed to a number of crimes and supposed murders which were never able to be corroborated. Sells said he kidnapped a woman in 1982 in Little Rock, Arkansas, with an accomplice, whom he raped, tortured, and killed, then dumped her body in a quarry. Law enforcement chose not to explore the deep quarry lake Sells led them to due to financial concerns. In 1986, Sells revealed that while he was working for Atlas Towing in St. Louis, he received a
call from a prostitute whose car had broken down. When he arrived at the vehicle, he suggested sex in lieu of paying for the towing cost. When she declined, Sells said he shot her and threw her body in a river. In 1988, Sells divulged that he met a woman and her son in Salt Lake City, Utah, and travelled with them to go on a camping trip. Sells claimed he killed her and her son by an unclear method and dumped both of their bodies in the Snake River in Gooding County, Idaho. Sells once stated to investigators that he had killed a black man and dumped his body in a dumpster in Chicago. He named the specific street intersection this allegedly occurred at, but no such murder was ever discovered.

Sells also claimed he killed a 20-year-old woman, whom he originally thought was a man, in a drug deal gone wrong in Truckee, California on January 27, 1989. A report of an unrelated incident established that Sells was in the area and an unidentified female body was found in the area at that time. In addition, at one time Sells claimed to have killed two unidentified female hitchhikers in May 1989 in Roseburg, Oregon. Finally, Sells referenced other additional victims whom he said to have killed and dumped them in the Florida swamps while he worked there as well as several gay men at various rest stops along the interstate in Pennsylvania. 

The state's attorney in Jefferson County, Illinois, declined to charge Sells with the Dardeen family homicides in 1987 because his confession to the quadruple killing, while generally consistent with the facts of the case as reported in the media, was inaccurate with concern to some details that had not been made public. He also changed his account three times regarding how he had met the family. Investigators wanted to bring Sells to southern Illinois to resolve their doubts, but Texas refused, due to its law forbidding death-row prisoners from leaving the state.

Sells was housed on death row in the Allan B. Polunsky Unit near Livingston, Texas. The Texas Department of Criminal Justice received him on November 8, 2000. In 2004, Sells confessed that on October 13, 1997, he broke into a home, took a knife from a butcher block in the kitchen, stabbed a little boy to death, and scuffled with a woman. Those details corroborated the account of Julie Rea Harper, who was initially convicted for the murder of her son, and then acquitted in 2006.

Execution
On January 3, 2014, a Del Rio judge set Sells' execution date for April 3, 2014. Sells' death sentence was carried out at the Texas State Penitentiary in Huntsville. When asked if he would like to make a final statement, Sells replied, "No." As a lethal dose of pentobarbital was administered, he took a few deep breaths, closed his eyes, and began to snore. Less than a minute later, he stopped moving. Thirteen minutes later, at 6:27 p.m. (CDT), he was pronounced dead. Krystal Surles and members of both the Harris and Perez families attended the execution.

In media 
Eight years before his execution, Sells was one of the featured interviewees on episode two ("Cold-Blooded Killers") of season one on the Investigation Discovery documentary series, Most Evil. The interview was done by forensic psychiatrist Dr. Michael Stone. In the interview, Sells claimed to have killed more than 70 people. ABC News created a 10-minute mini-documentary Tommy Lynn Sells - The Mind of a Psychopath. In 2021, A&E Networks original show I Survived A Serial Killer made an episode about the Fabienne Witherspoon story.

See also 

 List of people executed in Texas, 2010–2019
 List of people executed in the United States in 2014
 List of serial killers by number of victims
 List of serial killers in the United States

References

Further reading

External links

1964 births
2014 deaths
20th-century American criminals
21st-century executions by Texas
21st-century executions of American people
American atheists
American male criminals
American murderers of children
American people convicted of burglary
American people convicted of theft
American rapists
American twins
Executed American serial killers
Male serial killers
People convicted of murder by Texas
People executed by Texas by lethal injection
People from Kingsport, Tennessee
People with bipolar disorder
People with personality disorders